Akören (formerly: Gazlıgölakören) is a quarter of the town İhsaniye, İhsaniye District, Afyonkarahisar Province, Turkey. Its population is 364 (2021). Before the 2013 reorganisation, it was a town (belde).

References

İhsaniye District